Brotia armata is a species of freshwater snail with an operculum, an aquatic gastropod mollusk in the family Pachychilidae.

Distribution 
This species occurs in Thailand.

Human use
It is a part of ornamental pet trade for freshwater aquaria.

References

External links 

Gastropods described in 1968
armata